The May 2016 Diyarbakır bombing was a car bomb attack on an armored police vehicle in the Bağlar district of Diyarbakır, Turkey on Tuesday 10 May 2016 at approximately 10:50 local time. The attack, which targeted a police vehicle that was carrying officers escorting seven recently arrested Kurdish militants, killed 3 people and wounded at least 45 others including 12 police officers. The vehicle was carrying seven detainees, suspected members of the Kurdistan Workers Party (PKK) to a routine health check. The PKK's armed wing, the People's Defense Forces (HPG), later claimed that one of its trucks was transporting explosives and got shot, making it explode.

See also 
 February 2016 Diyarbakır bombing
 March 2016 Diyarbakır bombing
 2015 Diyarbakır rally bombings

References 

Terrorist incidents in Turkey in 2016
Terrorist incidents in Diyarbakır
Murder in Turkey
May 2016 crimes in Asia
Kurdistan Workers' Party attacks
2016 murders in Turkey
May 2016 events in Turkey